Winchester Regional Airport  is three miles southeast of Winchester, in Frederick County, Virginia. It was recognized by the state as a licensed commercial airport in 1937 and was Winchester Municipal Airport until 1987.

Most U.S. airports use the same three-letter location identifier for the FAA and IATA, but this airport is OKV to the FAA and WGO to the IATA (which assigned OKV to Okao Airport in Papua New Guinea).

Facilities
Its one runway, 14/32, is 5,500 by 100 feet (1,676 x 30 m); the runway supports instrument landing approaches, with the localizer on the northwest side of the airport.

For the 12 month period ending June 30, 2016, the airport had 44,115 aircraft operations, averaging 121 per day. Of these, 96% (42,250) were general aviation, and 4% (1,865) were air taxi. 99 aircraft were based at the airport at the time: 82 single-engine, 14 multi-engine, 1 jet, 1 helicopter and 1 ultralight.

References

External links

 

Airports in Virginia
Buildings and structures in Winchester, Virginia
Transportation in Frederick County, Virginia
Transportation in Winchester, Virginia
1937 establishments in Virginia